Ron Christopher Watts (born August 26, 1971), better known by his stage name Phat Kat aka Ronnie Euro, is a rapper from Detroit, Michigan, best known as a favorite collaborator of the late J Dilla.

Biography
His career began in the mid 1990s as part of 1st Down, which consisted of Phat Kat on vocals and Jay Dee on production.  The group was short lived however, possibly because of insufficient support/promotion from their label, Payday, but the two continued to collaborate on many occasions afterwards, starting with an appearance on "Fat Cat Song" and its remix, from Slum Village's Fan-Tas-Tic (Vol. 1).

In an interview, he spoke in regards to his time and music creations alongside Dilla, as well as the producer's work ethic:

 
His first full-length album, The Undeniable LP, was released on June 22, 2004 on Barak Records.  It featured appearances from Slum Village, Dwele, Big Tone of 87 Wasted Youth, and Obie Trice.  Kat released a 12-inch single in late 2006 for the song Cold Steel produced by J Dilla, he then followed it with his latest LP, Carte Blanche, on April 24 on Look Records.  The album has proved to be Kat's most universally acknowledged effort yet.

During a radio interview with T3 in WJLB, Phat Kat rung in and spoke against T3. He stated that T3 had dismantled the group, after the Reunion Pt 2 video was released and Elzhi wasn't in the video. T3 had said that he and Elzhi were still on good speaking terms, however Phat Kat contradicted him saying that "Elzhi ain't f***ing witchu, don't do that to the fans, keep it real". T3 didn't know what the future of Slum Village was as Elzhi hadn't released a statement regarding his intentions of whether to continue Slum Village and Phat Kat strongly disagreed. Phat Kat was incredibly incensed and continued to swear as T3 tried to explain.

Discography

Albums
The Undeniable LP (2004, Barak Records)
 The Quiet Bubble (2006, Mixtape)
Carte Blanche (2007, Look Records)
Katakombz (TBA)

EPs
Dedication To The Suckers EP (2000)
The Undeniable EP (2004)

Singles
 "1st Down" (Phat Kat & Jay Dee) - A Day Wit' the Homies (1995, Payday)
 "Dedication to the Suckers" (1999, House Shoes Recordings)
 "Club Banger" (2001, Barak)
 "Boss of All Bosses" featuring Phat Kat, Nature & P-Dap (2005, DMB Records)
 "Game Over" ft. Phat Kat & Jay Dee (2005, Ghostly International)
 "Cold Steel" (2007, Look Records)

Appearances
2001 "Featuring Phat Kat" (from the Jay Dee album Welcome 2 Detroit)
2004 "True Story" (from the B.R. Gunna album Dirty District: Vol. 2)
2004 "Zoom" (from the Slum Village album "Detroit Deli (A Taste of Detroit))
2005 "Hear This" (from the Slum Village album Slum Village)
2005 "Detroit Rapstar" (from the Lil Skeeter album Detroit Rapstar)
2007 "Lookatusnow" (from the Black Milk album Popular Demand)
2008 "Bonus Track prod. Metodo Shintaro" (from the Shotta album Sangre)
2008 "Keep It Real" with Elzhi and "Do It" (from the Cadik album Basic)
2008 "Oh X-Mas Tree" with King Gordy and Guilty Simpson (from the Fatt Father album Christmas With Fatt Father)
2008 "Success" with Guilty Simpson (from the Fatt Father album Fatt Father)
2012 "Raw Shit" with King Gordy and Seven The General) (from the Fatt Father album Fatherhood)
2017 "Wanna Get To Know Ya" (from the Retrospective for Love album Random Activities of a Heart'')

References

External links 
 Phat Kat's Official Website
 dropmagazine.com Interview with Phat Kat
 Metal Lungies.com interview with Phat Kat
 DetroitHipHop.net interview with Phat Kat

African-American male rappers
Living people
Midwest hip hop musicians
Rappers from Detroit
J Dilla
21st-century American rappers
1971 births